The 1996–97 season of the UEFA Cup Winners' Cup was won by Barcelona after beating holders Paris Saint-Germain in the final. It was the last of four occasions that the Spanish club won the tournament.

All times are CET/CEST.

Teams

TH Title Holders

Qualifying round

|}

First leg

Second leg

KR Reykjavík won 3–2 on aggregate.

Budapest Honvéd won 2–0 on aggregate.

2–2 on aggregate. Nyva Vinnytsia won on away goals. 

AEK Larnaca won 5–1 on aggregate. 

Gloria Bistrița won 4–2 on aggregate.

Ruch Chorzów won 6–1 on aggregate.

Chemlon Hummené won 3–0 on aggregate.

Dinamo Batumi won 9–0 on aggregate.

Sion won 4–2 on aggregate.

2–2 on aggregate. Vaduz won 4–2 on penalties.

3–3 on aggregate. Constructorul Chişinău won on away goals. 

Brann won 5–2 on aggregate.

1–1 on aggregate. Olimpija Ljubljana won 4–2 on penalties.

MyPa won 2–1 on aggregate. 

Varteks won 5–1 on aggregate.

Sparta Prague won 10–1 on aggregate.

1–1 on aggregate. Red Star Belgrade won on away goals.

First round

|}

First leg

Second leg

Sion won 6–0 on aggregate.

AEK Athens won 3–1 on aggregate.

2–2 on aggregate. Lokomotiv Moscow won on away goals.

Galatasaray won 5–0 on aggregate.

AIK won 2–1 on aggregate.

1–1 on aggregate. Olimpija Ljubljana won on away goals.

Brann won 6–3 on aggregate.

Benfica won 5–1 on aggregate.

Barcelona won 2–0 on aggregate.

3–3 on aggregate. Sparta Prague won on away goals.

Red Star Belgrade won 4–1 on aggregate.

Fiorentina won 2–1 on aggregate.

PSV Eindhoven won 4–1 on aggregate.

Nîmes won 5–2 on aggregate.

Liverpool won 4–1 on aggregate.

Paris Saint-Germain won 7–0 on aggregate.

Second round

|}

First leg

Second leg

AIK won 3–2 on aggregate.

Benfica won 4–2 on aggregate.

AEK Athens won 6–0 on aggregate.

Brann won 4–3 on aggregate.

Barcelona won 4–2 on aggregate.

Liverpool won 8–4 on aggregate.

Fiorentina won 3–2 on aggregate.

Paris Saint-Germain won 6–4 on aggregate.

Quarter-finals

|}

First leg

Second leg

Paris Saint-Germain won 3–0 on aggregate.

Barcelona won 4–2 on aggregate.

Fiorentina won 2–1 on aggregate.

Liverpool won 4–1 on aggregate.

Semi-finals
 

|}

First leg

Second leg

Paris Saint-Germain won 3–2 on aggregate.

After Barcelona's second goal, Iván de la Peña of Barcelona was hit by an object thrown from the stands and required medical assistance. As a result, Fiorentina received a two-match European competition stadium ban, enforced at the start of their 1998–99 UEFA Cup campaign.

Barcelona won 3–1 on aggregate.

Final

Top scorers
The top scorers from the 1996–97 UEFA Cup Winners' Cup are as follows:

See also
1996–97 UEFA Champions League
1996–97 UEFA Cup
1996 UEFA Intertoto Cup

Notes

References

External links 
 1996-97 competition at UEFA website
 Cup Winners' Cup results at Rec.Sport.Soccer Statistics Foundation
  Cup Winners Cup Seasons 1996-97 – results, protocols
 Archive of old pages site UEFA Season 1996–97, written protocol games.

3
UEFA Cup Winners' Cup seasons